Live in Asbury Park, Vol. 2 is a Clarence Clemons and Temple of Soul album that was recorded live at The Stone Pony in Asbury Park, New Jersey on September 2–3, 2001.  The album features a guest performance by Bruce Springsteen on lead vocals and lead guitar for the song “Raise Your Hand”.

Track listing
 "Another Place – Clarence Clemons, Jimmy Dillon  – 3:10
 "Fatha John" - Clarence Clemons, John Colby – 3:56
 "Livin’ Without You" – Clarence Clemons, John Colby – 4:38
 "Confession" - Clarence Clemons – 2:01
 "Road to Paradise" – Clarence Clemons, Jimmy Dillon, Dan Shea – 4:24
 "You're a Friend Of Mine" – Narada Michael Walden, Jeff Cohen – 5:08
 "I’ll Go Crazy" – James Brown  – 5:06
 "Raise Your Hand" – Steve Cropper, Eddie Floyd, Al Bell – 7:04
 "Lights Of The City" - Clarence Clemons – 5:25
 "Pink Cadillac" – Bruce Springsteen – 11:31

Personnel
 Produced by Clarence Clemons and John Colby
 Recorded and mixed by Toby Scott
 Clarence Clemons – saxophone, vocals, percussion
 Steve Argy – bass, vocals
 John Colby – piano, synthesizers, vocals
 Keith Cronin – drums
 Tomas Diaz – percussions, vocals
 Randi Fishenfeld – violin, vocals
 Billy Livesay – guitars, vocals
 Paul Pettitt  – organ, synthesizers, vocals
The Uptown Horns:
 Crispin Cioe  – alto, baritone sax
 Larry Etkin  – trumpet
 Bob Funk  – trombone
 Arno Hecht  – tenor sax

References

2004 live albums
Clarence Clemons albums
Asbury Park, New Jersey